Abu Arazeh (also Romanized as Abū ʿArāz̤eh) is a village in Nasar Rural District, Arvandkenar District, Abadan County, Khuzestan Province, Iran. At the 2006 census, its population was 95, in 14 families.

References 

Populated places in Abadan County